Amphiblemma amoenum is a species of plant in the family Melastomataceae. It is endemic to Cameroon.  Its natural habitat is subtropical or tropical moist lowland forests. It is threatened by habitat loss.

References

Endemic flora of Cameroon
amoenum
Endangered plants
Taxonomy articles created by Polbot